The Cominco Arena is a 2,537-seat multi-purpose arena in Trail, British Columbia. It is home to the Trail Smoke Eaters of the British Columbia Hockey League and also the Kootenay Ice of the BCMML. The arena was funded by donations from the community, particularly from local mining company Teck Resources (then known as Consolidated Mining and Smelting Company of Canada), and was built by tradesmen that volunteered their time. It was completed in 1949. The arena was also recently renovated. The seats in the stadium were wooden benches, but were replaced with orange stadium seats.

External links
Official Website | Information about the Arena

British Columbia Hockey League arenas
Indoor arenas in British Columbia
Indoor ice hockey venues in British Columbia
Sports venues in British Columbia
Trail, British Columbia